Dark Side of the Horse ("the black horse") is a Finnish comic strip, written and drawn by the comics artist Samuli Lintula under the pen name Samson. The strip features the horses Horace (Heikki, a steed) and Melody (Helka, a mare), and the bird Sine (Sini). In North America, the strip is syndicated by Andrews McMeel Syndication.

References

External links
 Official site 
 Dark Side of the Horse at GoComics.com

Finnish comic strips
Humor comics
Comics about animals
Fictional horses
2008 comics debuts